The Welcome metro station is an interchange station between the Red Line and the Pink Line of the Delhi Metro. It was one of the first stations during the Phase 1 and Phase 3 of the Delhi metro.

Station layout 
Red Line Station Layout

Pink Line Station Layout

See also
List of Delhi Metro stations

References

Delhi Metro stations
Railway stations opened in 2002
2002 establishments in Delhi
Railway stations in East Delhi district

